Thaloe is a genus of Caribbean anyphaenid sac spiders first described by Antônio Brescovit in 1993. it contains only three species, all found in Cuba and Hispaniola.

References

Anyphaenidae
Araneomorphae genera
Spiders of the Caribbean
Taxa named by Antônio Brescovit